Rami Aman is a Palestinian journalist and peace activist in the Gaza Strip.

Activism
In 2010, Aman founded the Gaza Youth Committee. Since 2015, through the committee, Aman has been organizing small-scale video chats between Israelis and Palestinian peace activists in the Gaza Strip in an initiative called "Skype With Your Enemy."

Detention
On 6 April 2020, amid the COVID-19 pandemic, the Gaza Youth Committee held one of its largest videoconferences via Zoom, with more than 200 participants. Opponents of normalizing relations with Israel were also on the call, resulting in a public uproar which prompted Hamas to arrest Aman and several other call participants.

On 9 April 2020, Aman surrendered himself at the Internal Security headquarters in Gaza City and has reportedly not been heard from since.

On 9 September 2020, a coalition of 70 NGOs lodged a complaint with the UN Working Group on Arbitrary Detention regarding the detention of Aman and demanded his release.

On 24 September 2020, The New York Times reported that Hamas military prosecutors in Gaza had charged Aman and two other Palestinian peace activists with "weakening revolutionary spirit" for their role in organizing the April 2020 video call with Israelis.

Release
On Monday, 26 October 2020, the Permanent Military Court in Gaza issued a decision to release Rami Aman and 2 other persons detained, sufficed with the time they served. 

Rami's imprisonment was described in the article from AP.

References

Living people
Year of birth missing (living people)
Palestinian journalists
Palestinian activists
Palestinian prisoners and detainees